C Tuckey ( 1924 in Sydney, Australia) was a rugby league footballer in Australia's major competition, the New South Wales Rugby League (NSWRL).

Tuckey played for the Eastern Suburbs club in the year 1924.

References
 The Eastern Suburbs Website

Australian rugby league players
Sydney Roosters players
Year of birth missing
Year of death missing
Rugby league players from Sydney